"Only a Fool" is the third single by Norwegian pop singer Marit Larsen, released from her debut album Under the Surface. The single spent only two weeks on the Norwegian Singles Chart and was only a radio release. It can only be purchased online as a single, as no hard copy is sold in stores.

Charts

References

External links
Marit Larsen Official Website

2006 singles
Marit Larsen songs
EMI Records singles
2005 songs
Songs written by Marit Larsen